KYIX (104.9 FM) is a repeater station for the Air 1 Radio Network based in Chico, California and licensed to South Oroville, California.  It is owned by Butte Broadcasting Company, Inc., which owns and operates sister station KKXX-AM.

Brief history
KYIX was originally a locally-run Christian station managed by Ron and Sarah Warkentin, later Randy and Monica Zachary of Reality Radio Ministries and was known as Reality Radio Y105. It then became a part of the Radio U network before being picked up by Air 1.

See also
 KKXX (AM)

External links

YIX
Air1 radio stations
Radio stations established in 1994
1994 establishments in California
YIX
Contemporary Christian radio stations in the United States